Wellenreuther is a surname. Notable people with the surname include:

 Claus Wellenreuther (born 1935), German entrepreneur, co-founder of SAP AG
 Ingo Wellenreuther (born 1959), German politician (CDU)
 Timon Wellenreuther (born 1995), German association footballer

German-language surnames